Hongqiao station may refer to the following:

Shanghai
 Shanghai Hongqiao railway station, in the Minhang District of Shanghai
 Hongqiao Railway Station metro station, a station of the Shanghai Metro
 Hongqiao Airport Terminal 1 station, a metro station which serves Shanghai Hongqiao International Airport
 Hongqiao Airport Terminal 2 station, a metro station which serves Shanghai Hongqiao International Airport
 Hongqiao Road station, a metro station in Changning District, Shanghai

Changsha
 Hongqiao station (Changsha Metro), station on the southern extension of Line 3 (Changsha Metro), in Yuelu District, Changsha, Hunan province

Kunming
 Hongqiao station (Kunming Metro), station on Line 3 (Kunming Metro), in Panlong District, Kunming, Yunnan province